Robert Ignatius McCarthy (December 6, 1920 – November 29, 2007) served in the California State Assembly for the 25th district and served as a State Senator for the 14th district. During World War II he served in the United States Army. His younger brother, Republican John F. McCarthy served in the Senate from 1951 to 1970.

References

United States Army personnel of World War II
1920 births
2007 deaths
20th-century American politicians
Politicians from San Francisco
Democratic Party members of the California State Assembly
Democratic Party California state senators